Troika is a Russian folk dance, where a man dances with two women. The Russian word troika means three-horse team/gear. In the Russian dance the dancers imitate the prancing of horses pulling a sled or a carriage.

This dance is included into repertoires of virtually all Russian ethnographic dance ensembles.

Similar folk dances are known among other Slavic peoples, e.g., the Polish Trojak.

A Cajun dance of the same name, Troika, exists, and is very similar to the Russian dance. It has been suggested that the Cajun version of the dance originated at the times when Cossacks of the Russian tsar army were stationed in Paris.

See also 
 List of ethnic, regional, and folk dances by origin
 Outline of dance

References

External links 
 Our Russian Folk Dance from the Kennedy Center's ArtsEdge program.

Dance in Russia
Cajun dance